R is a Mexican black comedy television series produced and distributed by Viacom International Studios and Claro Video. The series it premiere on 27 April 2020 in Latin America on Paramount Network, and on 7 May 2020 via streaming on Claro Video. It stars Mauricio Ochmann as the title character.

A total of 10 one-hour episodes were confirmed for the first season.

Plot 
The story revolves around Franco (Mauricio Ochmann), a man who lives a miserable life, since his wife does not respect him, and his children do not pay attention to him and only see him as a hindrance. As if that were not enough, after a medical examination Franco finds out that he has terminal cancer, and decides to live his life to the fullest without caring about anything. In his rampant madness, he murders a drug trafficker in self-defense and later learns that the medical certificate stating that he had cancer turned out to be false. So now Franco must flee from justice and from the partners of the drug trafficker he murdered.

Cast 
 Mauricio Ochmann as Francisco "Franco" Barrón
 Paulina Dávila as Magali
 Jesús Zavala as Juan Vallarta
 Marco de la O as Fidel
 Plutarco Haza as Eugenio Peralta
 Guillermo Quintanilla as San Clemente
 Gala Montes as Clara Langarica
 Lourdes Gazza as Ivana
 Pakey as Tristán
 Darío T. Pie as Eliseo Vega
 Luis Fernando Peña as El Conejo
 Ari Brickman as Lorenzo Langarica
 Renato Gutiérrez as Pablo Barrón
 Axel Castro as Nacho Gallegos
 Enrique Arreola as Carmona
 Carolina Anzures as Brenda Barrón
 Valeria Vera as Nastalia Romero
 Yuriria del Valle as Erica
 Andrés Almeida as Francisco Barón

References 

Claro Video original programming
Spanish-language television shows
Paramount Network original programming
2020 Mexican television series debuts
2020 Mexican television series endings